Bellwether Pictures is an American film production studio based in Los Angeles, United States. The company was founded by screenwriter, film director and producer Joss Whedon and his then-wife Kai Cole as co-founder/producer. Their purpose is to bring micro-budget films directly to an audience, bypassing "the classic studio structure".

History
In 2012, Bellwether released Much Ado About Nothing, for which Lionsgate and Roadside Attractions handled US theatrical distribution. The next production was Brin Hill's In Your Eyes. Written by Whedon, it became the studio's first endeavor in using a method of distribution for simultaneous release.

Filmography

References

Film production companies of the United States
2011 establishments in California
2011 establishments in the United States
Companies established in 2011